Grischa Niermann (born 3 November 1975 in Hannover) is a German former professional road bicycle racer, who competed as a professional between 1999 and 2012. He started his career in 1997 with the Die Continentale team, where he won the Hessen-Rundfahrt in 1998. His only victory after that with the Dutch squad was the Niedersachsen-Rundfahrt in 2001.

He has confessed to doping with EPO during his career.

Major results

 Regio-Tour – 1 stage (2008)
 Niedersachsen-Rundfahrt – Overall (2001)
 Regio-Tour – 1 stage & Overall (1999)
 Hessen Rundfahrt – 1 stage & Overall (1998)
 Volta ao Algarve – 1 stage (1998)

References

External links 
Personal website 
 

1975 births
Living people
German male cyclists
Sportspeople from Hanover
Cyclists from Lower Saxony